Luciano Ray Djim (born 3 August 1978) is a retired Central African Republic football striker.

References

1978 births
Living people
People from Bangui
Central African Republic footballers
Central African Republic international footballers
R. Charleroi S.C. players
R.A.A. Louviéroise players
C.S. Visé players
Union Royale Namur Fosses-La-Ville players
VfR Mannheim players
FC Senec players
Association football forwards
Belgian Pro League players
Slovak Super Liga players
Central African Republic expatriate footballers
Expatriate footballers in Belgium
Central African Republic expatriate sportspeople in Belgium
Expatriate footballers in Germany
Central African Republic expatriate sportspeople in Germany
Expatriate footballers in Slovakia
Central African Republic expatriate sportspeople in Slovakia